Pourquoi L'Amérique (translation: Why America) is a soundtrack album by American jazz saxophonist Eddie Harris recorded in 1968 for the documentary of the same name on American history from 1917 to 1939 by French film director Frédéric Rossif and released on the French AZ label.

Track listing
All compositions by Eddie Harris except as indicated
 "Pourquoi L'Amérique" – 3:30
 "La Terre" – 5:00
 "Odeur de la Poudre" – 3:45
 "Musique pour un Massacre" – 4:04
 "Mort d'un Ennemi Public" – 2:40
 "Pourquoi L'Amérique (Deuxième Version)" – 1:51
 "New Deal" – 3:39
 "Prelude to Pearl Harbor" – 1:50
 "Civilisation de Consommation" – 2:00
 "Grèves Sauvages" – 1:40
 "Parfois la Guerre" – 1:55
 "Raisins de la Colère" – 3:30
 Pourquoi L'Amérique (Troisième Version)" – 3:15

Personnel
Eddie Harris – tenor saxophone, varitone
Jodie Christian – piano
Melvin Jackson – bass
Billy Hart – drums

References 

Eddie Harris albums
1970 albums
Albums produced by Joel Dorn
Albums produced by Ahmet Ertegun